Hyper+ (formerly Hyper) was a Polish television programming block broadcast on Teletoon+ from 1 September 2001 to 1 July 2014. At launch, it replaced Game One-branded block which was broadcast on the channel from 1 August 1999 (when the channel was known as Minimax at the time) until 31 August 2001. It showed the computer gaming and Japanese anime series. It was shown every night from 10pm to 2am Polish time.

References

External links
  

Television programming blocks in Europe
2001 introductions
2001 establishments in Poland
2014 disestablishments in Poland